City Without Walls and other poems is a book by W. H. Auden, published in 1969.

The book contains Auden's shorter poems written from 1965 through 1968, together with his translations of the lyrics of Bertolt Brecht's Mother Courage, and a few poems written earlier. Among the best-known poems in the book are the title poem, "The Horatians", "Amor Loci", "Forty Years On", "Partition", "August, 1968", "Fairground", "River Profile", "Ode to Terminus", and the autobiographical "Prologue at Sixty." A five-part section titled "Marginalia" is written mostly in haiku.

The book is dedicated to Peter Heyworth.

References
John Fuller, W. H. Auden: A Commentary (1999)
Edward Mendelson, Later Auden (1999)

External links
The W. H. Auden Society

1969 books
Books by W. H. Auden
Poetry by W. H. Auden